Krušovice is a municipality and village in Rakovník District in the Central Bohemian Region of the Czech Republic. It has about 600 inhabitants.

Economy
Krušovice is known for Royal Brewery of Krušovice, the historic brewery where Krušovice beer is brewed.

Transport
Krušovice lies on the I/6 road, which connects Prague with Karlovy Vary, Cheb and with the German border, part of the European route E48.

Notable people
Charles Egon IV, Prince of Fürstenberg (1852–1896), German prince
Václav Rabas (1885–1954), painter

References

Villages in Rakovník District